The Minister of Public Security is the Government of Vietnam member in charge of the Ministry of Public Security. The Minister of Public Security directs the management functions of state for security; responsible organization, construction, management and the highest commander of the People's Public Security Forces. Moreover, the Minister of Public Security is a Member of the Politburo and Member of Council for National Defense and Security. The current Vietnamese Minister of Public Security is General Tô Lâm, since 8 April 2016.

Chain of command
 President
 Prime Minister
 Minister of Public Security

Lists of Ministers of Public Security

Director of Public Security (1946-1948)

Director of Vietnam Police Department (1948-1954)

Minister of Public Security (1954-1975)

Minister of Home Affairs (1975-1998)

Minister of Public Security (1998 – present)

References

Government of Vietnam
Minister of Public Security
Lists of political office-holders in Vietnam